During the British Raj period, Bhalala State, in the present-day Indian state of Gujarat, was a non-salute princely state and was governed by members of a Jhala dynasty.

The rulers ruled with title  of 
Taluqdar Saheb

History
During British period, Bhalala was a separate tribute-paying taluka  under the Wadhwan station thana. The taluka consisted of but one village and Half Dedadra Village in Wadhwan Taluka, the Taluqdar  were they were Jhala( RANA) Rajput and wadhvan state bhayat [1]

References

 This article incorporates text from a publication now in the public domain: 

Villages in Surendranagar district